Francesco "Frankie" Anthony Cena is a Canadian television presenter, musician and debate coach. He was born in Burnaby, British Columbia, Canada. He is known for being Mister World Canada in 2012, competing at Mister World that same year, and for later co-hosting multiple Mr. World and Miss World competitions.

Early & Personal life 
Cena, born 1991, graduated from the University of British Columbia in 2013. He is an openly bisexual man.

Career

Mister World and Miss World  
Cena was selected to represent Canada at the Mister World beauty pageant in 2012, held in Torbay, England. Cena then hosted the 2014 edition of Mister World, interviewing contestants, judging the talent portion of the competition, and presenting at the finale. Cena also worked as the Web Presenter for Miss World beauty pageant in 2014, conducting interviews and creating video coverage of the event featured on the Miss World website. He was frequently seen at events with Tara Teng, Miss World Canada 2012.

Cena was a co-host of the Miss World pageant in 2014, 2015, 2017, and 2018. He also co-hosted Mr. World 2014 and 2016. And he was in charge of the "Head to Head Challenge" during Miss World Canada 2020.

Music 
Cena's first performances were with the British Columbia Boys Choir at the age of nine, with whom he performed for Queen Elizabeth II at her 50th Jubilee. In 2012, Cena made it to the televised rounds of the final season of Canadian Idol, and he continues to post covers of popular songs and music videos on his Youtube channel and to perform at various concerts.
Cena was featured as one of the contestants in the Netflix reality show Sing On!, and he won $40,400.

Debate 
Following his own student debating career, Cena became coach of his former high school in 2012, winning regional and international championships. He went on to become coach of the Danish National Debate Team and, in 2016, founded Fostering Debate Talent (FDT) Academy, a private debate academy based in Vancouver, British Columbia, Canada.

See also 
 Mister World
 Miss World
 Mister World 2012
 Mister World Canada

References

External links
Official website

Living people
1991 births